Miss Grand Chile 2017 was the first edition of the Miss Grand Chile beauty pageant, held on September 22, 2017, at the Centro de Eventos Music Palace, Talca. Nine contestants representing nine cities competed for the title, of whom the representative of La Florida, Nicole Ebnerand, was named the winner. She then represented Chile at Miss Grand International 2017 held on October 25 in Vietnam, but got a non-placement.

In addition to crowning such the winner,  the Miss Supranational Chile 2017 title was also awarded to Konstanza Schmidt of Quillota, and one of the finalists, María Flores of Concepción, was later assigned to participate at the international event held in Myanmar in the following year.

Results

Contestants
9 contestants took part in the competition.

References

External links

 

Miss Grand Chile
Chilean awards
Grand Chile